Brasstown is an unincorporated community located mostly within Clay County, North Carolina, United States, though roughly one third of Brasstown is within the adjacent Cherokee County.

Etymology
The name, "Brasstown," was given to several historic towns in the Cherokee region, including this one.  The name resulted from confusion in translating the Cherokee name, "Itse'yĭ" (meaning 'New Green Place' or 'Place of Fresh Green') with "Ûňtsaiyĭ" (meaning "brass").

Annual opossum drop
The Opossum Drop was an annual event at Clay's Corner convenience store organized by Clay and Judy Logan. At midnight on New Year's Eve, instead of dropping an object, a plexiglass box containing a living opossum was lowered from the roof of the store.  At midnight the animal was lowered to the ground while a small crowd of local residents sometimes shot fireworks.

For many years the New Year's Eve celebration took place under much protest and with due cause. In 2018, the "Possum Drop" moved from Brasstown to Andrews, NC with Clay Logan remaining the organizer. In 2019, Clay's Corner reopened under the management of the Logan Family.   The Opossum Drop will not be held again as the young female opossum was caught in a leg hold trap and badly injured.   Her leg was broken and had to be amputated. So, as the possum can no longer be the center of attention, Clay's Corner will now be dropping a fake possum in honor of the tradition.

Education
The John C. Campbell Folk School, dedicated to preserving and encouraging the folk arts of the Appalachian Mountains, is located in Brasstown. It was listed on the National Register of Historic Places in 1983. The land for the Folk School was donated by Fred O. Scroggs, who wanted to preserve the folk teachings of mountain culture.

Tri-County Race Track
The Tri-County Race Track is a 1/4-mile banked dirt oval race track located in Brasstown, it often hosts races Friday evenings.

References

External links 
 NC HomeTownLocator
 "Brasstown", Roadside Thoughts

Unincorporated communities in Clay County, North Carolina
Unincorporated communities in North Carolina
Unincorporated communities in Cherokee County, North Carolina